The Susan Raye Show was an early American television program broadcast on the now defunct DuMont Television Network.

Broadcast history
The series ran from October to November of 1950. It was a musical program hosted by singer and pianist Susan Raye. The program, produced and distributed by DuMont, aired Mondays and Fridays at 7:45 PM on most DuMont affiliates, alternating with The Joan Edwards Show which was in the same time slot on Tuesdays and Thursdays.

The Susan Raye Show replaced The Hazel Scott Show, a very similar program which had starred pianist and singer Hazel Scott. Scott had been implicated in Red Channels as a supposed Communist sympathizer. Although Scott denied the charges, she was effectively blacklisted, and her series was cancelled. The Susan Raye Show filled the DuMont network's programming gap for two months. The series was cancelled after the November 20 broadcast.

Episode status
As with most DuMont series, no episodes are known to exist.

See also
List of programs broadcast by the DuMont Television Network
List of surviving DuMont Television Network broadcasts
1950-51 United States network television schedule

References

Bibliography
David Weinstein, The Forgotten Network: DuMont and the Birth of American Television (Philadelphia: Temple University Press, 2004) 
Alex McNeil, Total Television, Fourth edition (New York: Penguin Books, 1980) 
Tim Brooks and Earle Marsh, The Complete Directory to Prime Time Network TV Shows, Third edition (New York: Ballantine Books, 1964)

External links

DuMont historical website

DuMont Television Network original programming
1950 American television series debuts
1950 American television series endings
1950s American music television series
Black-and-white American television shows
English-language television shows
Lost American television shows